The 172nd Massachusetts General Court, consisting of the Massachusetts Senate and the Massachusetts House of Representatives, met in 1981 and 1982 during the governorship of Edward J. King. William Bulger served as president of the Senate and Thomas W. McGee served as speaker of the House.

"In 1981, the General Court overrode the veto of Gov. Edward King to make Massachusetts one of the first states to encourage recycling" by bottle deposit.

Senators

Representatives

See also
 97th United States Congress
 List of Massachusetts General Courts

References

Further reading

External links
 
 
 
 
 
 
  (1964-1994)

Political history of Massachusetts
Massachusetts legislative sessions
massachusetts
1981 in Massachusetts
massachusetts
1982 in Massachusetts